The Cyprus International Institute for Environmental and Public Health  was set up with the collaboration of Harvard School of Public Health (HSPH) and the government of Cyprus.

It deals with key environmental issues in Cyprus and the Mediterranean region and its training entities are:

1. The Cyprus International Institute (CII) for the Environment and Public Health

2. The HSPH-Cyprus Program (HCP) in Boston.

External links
Official website
http://www.highereducation.ac.cy/en/priv-hsph-cyprus.html

Medical and health organisations based in Cyprus